Dum Maro Dum may refer to:

"Dum Maro Dum" (song), from the 1971 film Hare Rama Hare Krishna and sung by Asha Bhosle
Dum Maaro Dum (film), 2011 Hindi film